How Great Thou Art: Gospel Favorites from the Grand Ole Opry is a live album of the Grand Ole Opry special of the same name, and features Alan Jackson, Loretta Lynn and Brad Paisley among others.

Track listing
"I'll Fly Away" - Charlie Daniels Band
"Blessed Assurance" - Alan Jackson
"Precious Memories" - Patty Loveless
"Precious Lord, Take My Hand" - Ronnie Milsap
"Family Bible" - Ricky Skaggs
"Just a Closer Walk With Thee" - Sara Evans
"The Old Rugged Cross" - Brad Paisley
"The Wayfaring Stranger" - Trace Adkins
"Where No One Stands Alone" - Loretta Lynn
"Give Me Jesus" - Vince Gill
"A House of Gold" - Dierks Bentley
"How Great Thou Art" - Carrie Underwood

Chart performance

References

External links
Amazon.com: How Great Thou Art: Gospel Favorites Live from the Grand Ole Opry: Various Artists
How Great Thou Art: Gospel Favorites Live From The Grand Ole Opry CD

Country albums by American artists
2008 live albums
2008 compilation albums
Live country music albums
Country music compilation albums
RCA Records live albums
Gospel albums by American artists
RCA Records compilation albums
Country pop compilation albums